Falmouth Town railway station is the most central of the stations in Falmouth, Cornwall, England. It is unstaffed; the station and the trains are operated by Great Western Railway. Despite only being opened in 1970, the station has already been known by three different names: Falmouth, The Dell, and Falmouth Town.

History

It was renamed The Dell on 5 May 1975 when the original Falmouth station was reopened, subsequently being renamed again, this time to Falmouth Town on 15 May 1989.

Facilities 
There is just one platform on the north side of the line (the side nearest the town centre) reached by a ramp from the car park. The platform is constructed from concrete slabs and piers, and a metal and glass waiting shelter is provided. There are no ticket buying facilities, so passengers have to buy a ticket in advance or from the guard on the train.

Location
The station is close to the National Maritime Museum Cornwall, and is the closest serving station for Falmouth University's Woodlane Campus. Both are indicated on the station's signs.

Services
All trains on the Maritime Line are operated by Great Western Railway. They run seven days each week and operate every half-hour Monday to Saturday daytime and hourly at other times.

Community Rail 
The railway from Truro to Falmouth is designated as a community rail line and is supported by marketing provided by the Devon and Cornwall Rail Partnership. The line is promoted under the "Maritime Line" name.

References

External links

Video footage of Falmouth Town Station

Railway stations in Cornwall
Railway stations in Great Britain opened in 1970
Railway stations opened by British Rail
Buildings and structures in Falmouth, Cornwall
Railway stations served by Great Western Railway
DfT Category F1 stations